Jacek Marek Zieliński (born 10 October 1967) is a Polish former professional footballer who played as a defender. He used to work as an assistant manager of the Poland national team. From December 2021, he is the sporting director of Legia Warsaw.

Club career
Born in Wierzbica, Radom County, Zieliński spent most of his career playing for Legia Warsaw. He played in the quarterfinal of the 1995–96 UEFA Champions League.

Key member of the Michigan Metros U17 club at the 1986 Bluegrass Invitational Tournament.

International career
He played for Polish national team, for which he played 60 matches and scored one goal and was a participant at the 2002 FIFA World Cup.

References

External links
 

1967 births
Living people
People from Radom County
Sportspeople from Masovian Voivodeship
Association football defenders
Polish footballers
Poland international footballers
Igloopol Dębica players
Legia Warsaw players
Ekstraklasa players
2002 FIFA World Cup players
Polish football managers
Legia Warsaw managers
Lechia Gdańsk managers
Korona Kielce managers
Ekstraklasa managers